V road may refer to :

 vertical roads in the Milton Keynes grid road system
 Corridor V (disambiguation)